Magic Time is an extensive three-disc compilation album containing music from the sunshine pop bands The Millennium, The Ballroom and Sagittarius and the artist Curt Boettcher. It was released in 2001.

It contains the entire Begin album by The Millennium and all of the single versions of songs from that album, as well as the entire previously unreleased album by The Ballroom and numerous demos by The Ballroom, Sagittarius and Boettcher.

Magic Time chronicles Boettcher's progression from The Ballroom to The Millennium, though it does not include anything from the Sagittarius album released during this time, Nor does it include any of his productions for other artists, including his productions for Lee Mallory, who was later an integral part of The Millennium.

Track listing

Disc one: The Ballroom
"Spinning, Spinning, Spinning"
"Love's Fatal Way"
"Would You Like to Go"
"Magic Time"
"You Turn Me Around"
"Forever"
"It's a Sad World"
"I'll Grow Stronger"
"Musty Dusty"
"Crazy Dreams"
"Lead Me to Love"
"A Time for Everything"
"Baby, Please Don't Go"
"Would You Like to Go" (instrumental)
"Forever (Instrumental)"
"I'll Grow Stronger" (instrumental)
"You Turn Me Around" (instrumental)
"Magic Time (instrumental)"
"It's a Sad World" (instrumental)
"Spinning, Spinning, Spinning" (instrumental)

Disc two: Assorted Milk & Honey
"I'm Not Living Here" - The Ballroom
"Opus to a Friend" - The Ballroom
"Believe You" - The Ballroom
"The Island (Original Version)" - The Ballroom
"5 AM (Original Version)" - The Ballroom
"Karmic Dream Sequence #1 (Original Version)" - The Ballroom
"Sun Arise" - The Ballroom
"Milk and Honey" - Summer's Children
"Too Young to Marry" - Summer's Children
"Love's Fatal Way (Instrumental)" - The Ballroom
"Another Time (Demo)" - Curt Boettcher
"Sea of Tears (Demo)" - Curt Boettcher & Dottie Holmberg
"Sunshine Today (Demo)" - The Ballroom
"Sunshine Today (Alternate Instrumental Version)" - Sagittarius
"Keeper of the Games (Demo)" - Curt Boettcher
"Dancing Dandelion (Demo)" - Curt Boettcher
"It Won't Always Be the Same (Instrumental)" - The Millennium
"There Is Nothing More to Say (Instrumental)" - The Millennium
"To Claudia on Thursday (Instrumental)" - The Millennium
"Lonely Girl" - Sagittarius

Disc three: The Millennium
"Prelude"
"To Claudia on Thursday"
"I Just Want to Be Your Friend"
"5 AM"
"I'm with You"
"The Island"
"Sing to Me"
"It's You"
"Some Sunny Day"
"It Won't Always Be the Same"
"The Know It All"
"Karmic Dream Sequence #1"
"There Is Nothing More to Say"
"Anthem (Begin)"
"Blight"
"Just About the Same"
"It's You (Single Version)"
"I Just Want To Be Your Friend (Single Version)"
"5 AM (Single Version)"
"Prelude (Single Version)"
"To Claudia on Thursday (Single Version)"
"There Is Nothing More to Say (Single Version)"

The Millennium albums
Albums produced by Curt Boettcher
2001 compilation albums
Split albums